AUKUS, also styled as Aukus, is a trilateral security pact between Australia, the United Kingdom, and the United States, announced on 15 September 2021 for the Indo-Pacific region. Under the pact, the US and the UK will assist Australia in acquiring nuclear-powered submarines.

The pact also includes cooperation on advanced cyber mechanisms, artificial intelligence and autonomy, quantum technologies, undersea capabilities, hypersonic and counter-hypersonic, electronic warfare, innovation and information sharing. The pact will focus on military capability, separating it from the Five Eyes intelligence-sharing alliance that also includes New Zealand and Canada.

The International Centre for Defence and Security called the pact "a powerful statement about the priority of the Indo-Pacific" and as a statement "that the larger institutional groupings aren’t acting with the common purpose and speed that the current strategic and technological environment demands".

The US Ambassador to Australia Caroline Kennedy called the pact a "greater and deeper partnership" between the countries and said that it would provide a "lot of deterrence" in the Indo-Pacific. The government of the People's Republic of China (PRC) was vocal in its contempt of the pact, accusing the three western countries of having a "cold-war mentality", as the pact was widely seen as being, at least in part, a response to China's status as an increasingly assertive emerging superpower.

The creation of the pact spelled the end of a French–Australian submarine deal. On 17 September 2021, France, which is an ally of the three countries, recalled its ambassadors from Australia and the US; French foreign minister Jean-Yves Le Drian called the pact a "stab in the back" following Australia's cancellation of the deal worth €56 billion (A$90 billion) without notice, ending recent efforts to develop a deeper strategic partnership between France and Australia.

Background

Naval Group–Australia strategic partnership agreement 

In 2009, two years after the start of the project to replace the Royal Australian Navy's conventionally-powered  submarines, the Australian Defence White Paper stated: "The Government has ruled out nuclear propulsion for these submarines".

The design was based on the latest French nuclear-powered attack submarine, the Barracuda class, which required converting the nuclear propulsion to conventional propulsion. Another difference was that Australia chose to equip it with a United States Navy combat system and torpedo with Lockheed Martin Australia selected to integrate them into the design. Australia typically requires that part of their vessels be built there, which increases the cost. In this case it corresponded to 60 per cent of the contract value, with France handling the technology transfer.

In 2019, Australia signed a strategic partnership agreement with Naval Group to design and construct twelve submarines to be built in Australia. However, the project was beset by delays and cost overruns, leading to uncertainty and tension behind the scenes. The revised cost, including inflation during the length of the program, was A$90 billion (€56 billion).

In February 2021, an initial design plan was rejected as being too expensive, and Naval Group were given until September to improve their proposal. At a Senate inquiry in early June 2021, with delays ongoing, Defence Secretary Greg Moriarty revealed under questioning that he had considered making contingency plans if the French project was to fail, admitting that there had been ongoing problems for over a year. Two weeks later, Australian prime minister Scott Morrison met French president Emmanuel Macron in Paris and expressed concern about the project going off track, to which Macron replied that France was giving "full and complete" commitment and would proceed "further and faster if possible".

On 30 August 2021, the French and Australian defence and foreign affairs ministers released a joint statement reaffirming the project, stating that the "Ministers underlined the importance of the Future Submarine program."

Less than three weeks later, Australia decided to publicly cancel the contract with Naval Group for the Attack-class submarines despite having already spent about A$2.4 billion on the French project. It was expected that Australia would have to pay hundreds of millions of euros in penalties for cancelling the contract. The contract contained "control gates" with "off-ramps" at which point Australia could withdraw from the contract.

The Australian Department of Defence wrote to Naval Group on the same day the security pact was announced. The French Ministry of Defence claim the department told them that "they were satisfied with the submarine's achievable performance and with the progress of the program." Naval Group said that Australia "terminated the contract for convenience".

Morrison said that Australia now required a nuclear-powered submarine which has the advantages of greater speed, remaining underwater for longer and carrying heavier loads than a conventionally powered submarine, based on a change in the strategic situation in the Indo-Pacific.

Australia–UK–US negotiations 
The Sunday Telegraph reported that in March 2021 the Australian navy chief Vice Admiral Michael Noonan met in London with his British counterpart Admiral Tony Radakin and requested assistance from the UK and the US in acquiring nuclear-powered submarines. The Daily Telegraph reported that British Foreign Secretary Dominic Raab "helped broker the deal". The New York Times too reported that Australia first approached the UK for assistance. The Wall Street Journal reported Australia approached the US in April 2021. A trilateral discussion was held between Johnson, Biden and Morrison at the June 2021 G7 summit held in Cornwall, England. The talks took place without the knowledge of the French government or Naval Group. This approach was possible as a result of the UK not entering into a formal foreign policy and security treaty in the post-Brexit deal with the EU. As a result, the UK was free to pursue enhanced cooperation with other allies. Axios reported that the Biden administration sought assurances from Australia that cancelling the contract was not dependent on the US providing them with assistance and that cancelling was a fait accompli. Morrison said Australia had been considering an alternative to the Attack-class submarine deal for the past 18 months.

Although the joint announcement by Australian prime minister Scott Morrison, British prime minister Boris Johnson and US president Joe Biden did not mention any other country by name, except France, anonymous White House sources have alleged it is designed to counter the influence of Chinese forces in the Indo-Pacific region. However, Johnson later told parliament that the move was not intended to be adversarial toward China.

US Secretary of State Antony Blinken and US Secretary of Defense Lloyd Austin said that Australia did not have any "reciprocal requirements" as a consequence of the US sharing nuclear submarine propulsion technology such as Australia hosting intermediate-range missiles.

Features

Nuclear-powered submarines 

Under the pact, the US will share nuclear propulsion technology with Australia the same as it has with the UK since 1958 under the US–UK Mutual Defence Agreement as will the UK. The Royal Australian Navy will acquire at least eight nuclear-powered submarines armed with conventional weapons to be built in Australia. The basic design and key technologies will be decided by the Nuclear-Powered Submarine Task Force an 18-month Department of Defence research project headed by Vice Admiral Jonathan Mead, begun in September 2021 with assistance from the US and UK.

Australia will extend the life of its Collins-class submarines that the Attack class was due to replace and may consider leasing or buying nuclear-powered submarines from the US or the UK in the interim until the delivery of its future nuclear powered submarines. Also in the interim, Australian Defence Minister Peter Dutton said that Australia will have regular visits by US and UK nuclear-powered submarines. The annual Australia-US Ministerial Consultations (AUSMIN) between the Australian Ministers for Foreign Affairs and Defence and the US Secretaries of State and Defense held in September 2021 endorsed "increasing logistics and sustainment capabilities of U.S. surface and subsurface vessels in Australia."

Australia considered purchasing French nuclear submarines which use nuclear reactors fuelled by low-enriched uranium at less than 6%. However, French reactor designs have to be refuelled every ten years, and Australia does not have a civil nuclear capability with nuclear energy prohibited. In contrast, American and British designs power the submarines for the expected life of the submarines using nuclear reactors fuelled by highly enriched uranium (HEU) at 93% enrichment.

Currently, only six countries have nuclear submarines, the five permanent members of the UN Security Council (China, France, Russia, the United Kingdom and the United States) and India. The New York Times reported that Australia will probably buy HEU from the US for the nuclear reactor that powers the submarine. The United States' naval reactors are all pressurized water reactors (PWR). The latest UK propulsion system is the Rolls-Royce PWR3 that will power the Royal Navy's new  submarines currently being built and is "based on a US design but using UK reactor technology".

US officials have said that sharing nuclear propulsion technology with Australia is a "one-off" and that they have no "intention of extending this to other countries". South Korea, also a US treaty ally, has had ambitions to acquire nuclear-powered submarines since 2017 and was reportedly refused US assistance in September 2020 because of nuclear non-proliferation.

On 22 November 2021, Australia, the US and the UK signed the Exchange of Naval Nuclear Propulsion Information Agreement (ENNPIA) treaty. The treaty permits the disclosure of information by the US and the UK to Australia and its use. The US is restricted by the Atomic Energy Act of 1946 from sharing information without an agreement and the UK is also restricted by the 1958 US-UK Mutual Defence Agreement unless authorised. The treaty was considered in Australia by the Parliament's Joint Standing Committee on Treaties, in the UK by the Parliament and in the US by Congress. The ENNPIA treaty entered into force on 8 February 2022.

On 31 August 2022, the UK announced that Australian submariners would receive training aboard Astute-class submarines.

On 8 March 2023, US officials reported that Australia would purchase three Virginia-class submarines, with the option to acquire a further two more. These submarines would fulfil the capability gap when the Collins class boats are retired. A longer term solution will involve Australia and the UK jointly developing a new submarine based on the SSN(R) design already under development.

Computer and cybertechnology 
The announcement of AUKUS included the stated aim of improving "joint capabilities and interoperability. These initial efforts will focus on cyber capabilities, artificial intelligence, quantum technologies, and additional undersea capabilities." Tom Tugendhat, chair of the British Commons' Foreign Affairs Committee, later commented on Twitter that "Bringing together the military-industrial complex of these three allies together is a step-change in the relationship. We've always been interoperable, but this aims at much more. From artificial intelligence to advanced technology the US, UK and Australia will now be able to cost save by increasing platform sharing and innovation costs. Particularly for the smaller two, that's game-changing." Engineering & Technology pointed to the increasing expansion of Chinese technology firms such as Huawei, which has been excluded from tendering for participation in telecommunications networks by the US and Australia on national security grounds, and government vetoes over the attempted Chinese acquisition of American company Lattice Semiconductor and ongoing British consideration of proposed takeovers of local semiconductor firms. Engineering & Technology also pointed to the March 2021 statement of the US National Security Commission on AI, of the imperative to intensify local efforts but also "rally our closest allies and partners to defend and compete in the coming era of AI-accelerated competition and conflict".

Hypersonic and counter-hypersonic 
Under the pact, the three countries will cooperate to accelerate development of hypersonic missiles and defence against such missiles. Hypersonic and counter-hypersonic cooperation was one of four additional areas of cooperation announced on 5 April 2022. Australia and the US have been cooperating on the development of hypersonic missiles since 2020 after signing an agreement to "flight test full-size prototype hypersonic cruise missiles" under the Southern Cross Integrated Flight Research Experiment (SCIFiRE).

Nuclear proliferation concerns 
The Nuclear Nonproliferation Treaty allows non-nuclear-weapon states to produce the highly enriched uranium for naval reactor fuel. Nevertheless, the agreement to transfer US or UK nuclear submarine technology including possibly highly enriched uranium has been described as an act of nuclear proliferation, and has been criticised by scholars and politicians. In the Bulletin of the Atomic Scientists, scholar Sébastien Philippe criticised AUKUS and wrote "we can now expect the proliferation of very sensitive military nuclear technology in the coming years, with literally tons of new nuclear materials under loose or no international safeguards." James M. Acton of the Carnegie Endowment for International Peace wrote that "the nonproliferation implications of the AUKUS submarine deal are both negative and serious. For Australia to operate nuclear-powered submarines, it will have to become the first non-nuclear-weapon state to exercise a loophole that allows it to remove nuclear material from the inspection system of the International Atomic Energy Agency. I have no real concerns that Australia will misuse this material itself, but I am concerned that this removal will set a damaging precedent. In the future, would-be proliferators could use naval reactor programs as cover for the development of nuclear weapons."

Australia and Brazil would be the first countries without nuclear weapons to have nuclear-powered submarines. Concerns were raised that this may lead to increased risk of arms proliferation if other countries follow the same approach because it would involve other countries enriching uranium for naval reactors, potentially creating more avenues to develop material needed for nuclear weapons without the safeguards provided by regular inspections. This would not apply in the case of Brazil because the reactor will use low enriched uranium at 7% concentration. 20% is the minimum level required to make a nuclear weapon.

Comments and responses from participating countries

Australia 
The federal opposition leader at the time, Anthony Albanese, of the Australian Labor Party, said that his party would support nuclear submarines as long as there was no requirement to have a domestic civil nuclear industry, no possession of nuclear weapons and that the deal is consistent with Australia's responsibilities under the nuclear non-proliferation treaty. Former Labor prime minister Paul Keating condemned the deal, saying "This arrangement would witness a further dramatic loss of Australian sovereignty, as material dependency on the United States robbed Australia of any freedom or choice in any engagement Australia may deem appropriate". Former Labor prime minister Kevin Rudd warned against overly obtrusive criticism of China and recommended that Australia focus on quietly improving military capability.

Former Liberal prime minister Malcolm Turnbull, who had signed the original deal for the Attack class submarines called the decision to scrap the deal "an appalling episode in Australia's international affairs and the consequences of it will endure to our disadvantage for a very long time". He called the actions of his successor as deceitful and that it would damage Australia as foreign nations would not longer be able to trust Australia.

Former Liberal prime minister Tony Abbott called the move "the biggest decision that any Australian government has made in decades" as "it indicates that we are going to stand shoulder to shoulder with the United States and the United Kingdom in meeting the great strategic challenge of our time, which obviously, is China". Abbott said that Australia would be safer as a result, and cited China's increasing naval firepower as a justification for the deal.

The Australian defence minister at the time, Peter Dutton, responded by saying that Australia wanted peace and stability and "an opportunity for Indonesia, Vietnam and Sri Lanka and Korea to continue to develop". Dutton further dismissed "outbursts from China" and said that Australia was a "proud democracy" committed to "enduring peace and this collaboration makes it a safer region ... no amount of propaganda can dismiss the facts".

Australian Greens leader Adam Bandt criticised the deal, saying that it escalates tensions in the region and "makes Australia less safe".

In December 2022, the online publication East Asia Forum (based at the Australian National University) published an article stating that AUKUS highlights the need for Australia to have an advanced industrial base to sustain its planned acquisition of nuclear-powered submarines, as well as to support hypersonic and artificial intelligence (AI) military systems.

United Kingdom 
Prime Minister at the time, Boris Johnson said that the deal would create "hundreds of high-skilled jobs" and "preserve security and stability around the world" but said that the relationship with France was "rock solid". Conservative MP Tom Tugendhat said: "After years of bullying and trade hostility, and watching regional neighbours like the Philippines see encroachment into their waters, Australia didn't have a choice, and nor did the US or UK [to make the deal]". Former prime minister Theresa May questioned whether the UK would be forced into a war with China should Taiwan be invaded.

Johnson responded to French anger on 21 September by saying "I just think it's time for some of our dearest friends around the world to prenez un grip about this and donnez-moi un break"; the latter being broken French for "get a grip and give me a break". He made further reference to the deal in his speech at the Conservative Party Conference the next month, touting it as "a supreme example of global Britain in action, of something daring and brilliant that would simply would not have happened if we'd remained in the EU", whilst acknowledging "a certain raucous squawkus from the anti-AUKUS caucus."

Foreign Secretary at the time, Liz Truss viewed AUKUS as the beginning of a "Network of Liberty", and also stated "On security we are striking new pacts to protect our sea routes, trade routes and freedoms", adding that "We are in talks with Japan about better military access and operational support between our two countries [and] we want closer security ties with key allies like India and Canada in everything from fighting cyber to traditional defence capability".

Former leader of the Labour Party Jeremy Corbyn called the pact "crazy beyond belief", with Labour members voting to condemn the pact as dangerous to world peace.

The British High Commissioner to Australia Victoria Treadell told ABC Radio "This is not an issue of this Anglosphere and I really do think we have to move away from defining countries like Australia, US and the UK as Anglosphere".

United States 
President Joe Biden stated that the deal was a way to "address both the current strategic environment in the (Indo-Pacific) region and how it may evolve". After a call between the French and US presidents, the White House acknowledged the crisis could have been averted if there had been open consultations between allies. It was agreed the process would continue in such manner.

International responses

Japan 
On 12 April 2022, Sankei Shimbun reported that the United States, United Kingdom, and Australia were inquiring about Japan's participation in the security framework of AUKUS. The newspaper added that the aim of said negotiations was related to the incorporation of Japanese hypersonic weapon development and the strengthening of electronic warfare capabilities. 
Prior to this, in November 2021, former prime minister Shinzo Abe in a virtual address to the Sydney Dialogue, welcomed the creation of AUKUS in the midst of an increasingly severe security environment, and called for greater Japan-AUKUS cooperation and integration concerning artificial intelligence and cyberwarfare capabilities.
The U.S. denied inviting Japan into the security alliance, with Jen Psaki stating that Sankei Shimbun's report was "inaccurate". 
This was followed up by a refutation from Hirokazu Matsuno, the Japanese chief cabinet secretary. On 10 December 2022, Australia's Minister for Defence announced their desire for Japan to join the pact.

On 14 March 2023, Japanese Prime Minister Kishida Fumio expressed his support for Australia's planned acquisition of US-made nuclear-powered submarines under the AUKUS pact.

France 
The French government received official notification from Australia that the Attack-class submarine project was to be cancelled only a few hours before it was publicly announced. Le Monde reported that the original cost of the project in 2016 was €35 billion of which €8 billion (A$12 billion) was to go to French companies. The project was reportedly going to employ 4,000 people in France over six years at Naval Group and its 200 subcontractors. The French government was angered by both the cancellation of the Attack-class submarine project and not being made aware of the negotiations that led to the AUKUS agreement. In a joint statement, French foreign minister Jean-Yves Le Drian and armed forces minister Florence Parly expressed disappointment at Australia's decision to abandon their joint submarine program with France.

Le Drian further stated in a radio interview that the contract termination was a "stab in the back". On 17 September, France recalled its ambassadors from Australia and the US, Jean-Pierre Thébault and Philippe Étienne respectively. Despite tension in the past, France had never before withdrawn its ambassador to the United States. In a statement, Le Drian said that the "exceptional decision is justified by the exceptional gravity of the [AUKUS] announcements" and that the snap cancellation of the submarine contract "constitute[d] unacceptable behaviour between allies and partners". French president Emmanuel Macron has not commented but is reported to have been "furious" about the turn of events. In response to questions about the Australia-EU trade deal currently being negotiated, French Secretary of State for European Affairs Clément Beaune stated that he doesn't see how France can trust Australia. Arnaud Danjean, a French MEP, said that "Australians can expect more than a delay in concluding the Free Trade Agreement with the EU". French Lowy Institute policy analyst Hervé Lemahieu said the diplomatic damage from the cancellation will take years to repair and leave a lasting legacy of mistrust". After a call between the French and US presidents, the French ambassador returned to the US on 30 September.

Beaune described the United Kingdom as a junior partner and vassal of the United States due to the pact, saying in an interview: "Our British friends explained to us they were leaving the EU to create Global Britain. We can see that this is a return into the American lap and a form of accepted vassalisation." Le Drian stated that "We have recalled our ambassadors to [Canberra and Washington] to re-evaluate the situation. With Britain, there is no need. We know their constant opportunism. So there is no need to bring our ambassador back to explain." A Franco-British defence summit was cancelled.

Some opposition politicians in France, such as Xavier Bertrand, Jordan Bardella, and Fabien Roussel, criticised the French government and demanded that France leave NATO, with Christian Jacob as well as demanding a parliamentary inquiry.

A foreign ministers meeting between France, Germany, the UK, and the US had been postponed, and a ministerial meeting between Australia, France, and India was cancelled. France however, contacted India to talk about strengthening their cooperation in the Indo-Pacific. France's foreign commerce minister declined a meeting with his Australian counterpart.

French president Macron said that Europe needs to stop being naïve when it comes to defending its interests and build its own military capacity.

Following the ousting of Scott Morrison's government after the 2022 Australian federal election, the new Labor government led by Prime Minister Anthony Albanese agreed to a €555 million (US$584 million) settlement with French defence contractor Naval Group. In response, French defence minister Lecornu said that France aims to rebuild its relationship with Australia. In addition, Albanese announced plans to travel to France to reset bilateral relations between the two countries.

China 
The People's Republic of China (PRC)'s foreign affairs department spokesperson Zhao Lijian said, "The nuclear submarine cooperation between the US, the UK, and Australia has seriously undermined regional peace and stability, intensified the arms race and undermined international non-proliferation efforts". Zhao also said "The three countries should discard the Cold War zero-sum mentality and narrow geopolitical perspective". Spokesperson Hua Chunying said "China is firmly opposed to the US, the UK and Australia's malicious exploitation of loopholes in the Nuclear non-proliferation treaty and the International Atomic Energy Agency safeguards mechanism".

The Chinese Communist Party-owned tabloid Global Times, which is known for being more aggressive than official government statements, denounced Australia and said it had "turned itself into an adversary of China" and warned that Australia could be targeted by China as a warning to other countries if it acted "with bravado" in alliance with the US, or by being "militarily assertive". It further told Australia to avoid "provocation" or else China would "certainly punish it with no mercy", and concluded "Thus, Australian troops are also most likely to be the first batch of western soldiers to waste their lives in the South China Sea".

A Chinese Communist Party official, Victor Gao — former interpreter for Deng Xiaoping and vice president of a Beijing think tank, the Center for China and Globalization — considered the move to be a violation of international law and warned that Australia's moves towards nuclear-powered submarines would lead to the country "being targeted with nuclear weapons," in a future nuclear war.

The PRC ambassador to France Lu Shaye urged the new alliance to fulfill their nuclear non proliferation obligations and said Asia-Pacific needs jobs, not submarines, and urged France to boost cooperation.

Other countries 
   The deal was announced in the midst of the 2021 Canadian federal election. Opposition politicians quickly attacked Prime Minister Justin Trudeau over Canada's exclusion from the pact, to which Trudeau responded by stating that "This is a deal for nuclear submarines, which Canada is not currently or any time soon in the market for. Australia is." Leader of the Official Opposition Erin O'Toole stated that he would seek to join the alliance if elected.
   Danish Prime Minister Mette Frederiksen said that Joe Biden is "very loyal" to Europe and that "we should not turn... challenges, which will always exist between allies, into something they should not be." The Prime Minister also said she did not understand the criticism coming from Paris and Brussels.
   German Minister of State for Europe Michael Roth described the row as a "wake up call" and stated that the EU must speak with one voice and that rebuilding lost trust will not be easy.
   The Indonesian Ministry of Foreign Affairs has expressed concerns about the implications of the Australian acquisition of nuclear-powered submarines for "the continuing arms race and power projection in the region." It called on Canberra to maintain its commitment to regional peace and stability. Indonesia later cancelled a planned visit by Australian Prime Minister Scott Morrison amid the fallout of the AUKUS deal. On 22 September 2021, the People's Representative Council's Commission I, urged President Joko Widodo to take a strong stand over the AUKUS deal through the auspices of ASEAN. Commission I member Rizki Aulia Rahma described the formation of AUKUS as a threat to Indonesian national defence and sovereignty. The Foreign Ministry responded that they were working on a response to the issues posed by AUKUS.
   President Taneti Maamuu said that the deal puts the region at risk and that he was not consulted in relation to it. In the past the UK and US tested nuclear weapons in Kiribati, so they are concerned about nuclear submarines being developed. Kiribati recently switched diplomatic recognition from Taiwan to the China mainland. Beijing told Kiribati it is listening, whereas they felt that Australia is not listening to them. Mr Maamau said he is looking to Australia to show leadership as it debates a commitment to net zero emissions by 2050.
   Malaysian Prime Minister Ismail Sabri Yaakob said he had raised concerns about the project with Mr. Morrison, and warned that the nuclear submarine project might heighten military tensions in Asia. He urged all parties to avoid any provocation, as well as an arms race in the region. "At the same time, it will provoke other powers to take more aggressive action in this region, especially in the South China Sea," Mr Yaakob said. Ismail Sabri also stressed the importance of respecting and adhering to Malaysia's existing stance and approach to nuclear-powered submarines operating in Malaysian waters, including under the United Nations Convention on the Law of the Sea and the Southeast Asian Nuclear-Weapon-Free Zone Treaty. Australia has since dispatched officials to Kuala Lumpur to clarify about the deal. Malaysian Minister of Foreign Affairs Saifuddin Abdullah agreed to the suggestion of Australian Minister of Foreign Affairs, Marise Payne for an in-depth briefing over the matter. In response to the announcement of the agreement Malaysia's defence Minister proposed an immediate working trip to China to discuss AUKUS, as they wanted to get views of AUKUS from China's Leadership.
   On 16 September 2021, New Zealand Prime Minister Jacinda Ardern issued a statement reiterating New Zealand's stance that no nuclear submarines were permitted in its waters, while also stating that they were not approached about the pact and that she would not have expected them to have been approached. Ardern said the leaders of the three member states were "very well versed" in New Zealand's nuclear-free policy and would have "understood our likely position on the establishment of nuclear-powered submarines". Notably, Ardern was the first foreign politician that Morrison informed prior to the public announcement. Judith Collins, the leader of the National Party, expressed disappointment that New Zealand was not approached to join the pact for the non-submarine co-operation areas.
  Democratic People's Republic of Korea (North Korea)  The Foreign Ministry of the Democratic People's Republic of Korea issued a statement condemning the deal as "extremely undesirable and dangerous" which would "upset the strategic balance in the Asia-Pacific region", potentially destroying the nuclear non-proliferation system, and criticising the "double-dealing" of the U.S. which "seriously threatens the world peace and stability" stating that North Korea will take counteraction if the alliance threatens the country.
   Through a statement released by the Department of Foreign Affairs, the Philippines welcomed the signing of the trilateral security pact. Foreign Secretary, Teodoro Locsin Jr. highlighted that "the enhancement of a near-abroad ally's ability to project power should restore and keep the balance rather than destabilise it", Secretary Locsin further added that without an actual presence of nuclear weapons within the region, the Philippines therefore finds that the AUKUS move would not constitute a violation of the 1995 Southeast Asian Nuclear Weapons Free Zone treaty.
   Portuguese Minister Augusto Santos Silva said "In general, we ourselves express our solidarity with France, which has not been treated with due respect in this process", adding that "clearly, the form was not one that should have been followed".
 – Russian Deputy Foreign Minister Sergei Ryabkov expressed concern, stating "This is a great challenge to the international nuclear non-proliferation regime." and that "We are also concerned about the … partnership that will allow Australia, after 18 months of consultations and several years of attempts, to obtain nuclear-powered submarines in sufficient numbers to become one of the top five countries for this type of armaments."
   Prime Minister Lee Hsien Loong welcomed Australia's assurance that its new defence pact with the US and the UK aims to promote a "stable and secure" Asia Pacific amid China's concerns.
   Vice President Lai Ching-te, immediately welcomed the pact, referring to it "as a positive development for democracy, peace, and prosperity in the region." The foreign affairs spokesperson said, "Taiwan, on the groundwork of the Taiwan Relations Act and the Six Guarantees, will continue to deepen the close partnership with the United States, maintain the rules-based international order, and the peace, stability, and prosperity in the Taiwan Strait and in the Indo-Pacific region together." Taiwan's Foreign Minister Joseph Wu also welcomed the pact, stating "We are pleased to see that the like-minded partners of Taiwan — the United States and the UK and Australia — are working closer with each other to acquire more advanced defence articles so that we can defend Indo-Pacific".
 Others   Morrison said he contacted prime ministers Yoshihide Suga of Japan, Narendra Modi of India, and Lee Hsien Loong of Singapore. South Korea has also remained silent.

European Union
President of the European Commission, Ursula von der Leyen, who told CNN that "one of our member states has been treated in a way that is not acceptable. ... We want to know what happened and why." The EU also demanded an apology from Australia. President of the European Council Charles Michel denounced a "lack of transparency and loyalty" by the US. The EU said the crisis affects the whole union.

Preparations for a new EU-US trade and technology council between the US and EU were postponed. France eventually dropped their opposition to these talks which took place in Pittsburgh on September 29, 2021. France also attempted to delay the free trade talks between the EU and Australia. Apparently "most of Europe felt that transatlantic ties were too important to sacrifice to French pique"; such as the pro-free trade Northern Europe countries, as well as Eastern European nations that prioritize security ties with Washington, who "resented the French attempt to impose its indignation on the rest of the bloc". Key advocates for the TTC talks included EU's digital chief Margrethe Vestager, who favors open markets, and EU trade chief Valdis Dombrovskis from Latvia, who views the U.S. alliance and NATO as a vital counterweight to Russia and China. Lithuanian deputy European Affairs Minister Arnoldas Prankevicius proclaimed "What is important is to keep trans-Atlantic unity, because we believe this is our biggest strength and biggest value, especially vis-à-vis such countries as Russia and China".

See also 

 Allied technological cooperation during World War II
 Anglosphere
 ANZUS – 1951 Australia, New Zealand, the United States Security Treaty
 ASEAN
 AUSCANNZUKUS
 ABCANZ Armies
 Five Eyes
 Five Power Defence Arrangements (FPDA) – Defence cooperation among Australia, Malaysia, New Zealand, Singapore and UK
 Free and Open Indo-Pacific (FOIP)
 List of military alliances
 Military alliance
 Quadrilateral Security Dialogue (Quad) – Strategic dialogue among Australia, India, Japan and the U.S.
 Second Cold War
 Southeast Asia Treaty Organization (SEATO)
 Tizard Mission
 
 US–UK Mutual Defence Agreement
 United States foreign policy toward the People's Republic of China

Notes

References

External links

 Text of the Joint Leaders Statement on AUKUS
 AUKUS Hansard (UK) debate
 Address by the Prime Minister of Australia 

2021 establishments
2021 in American politics
2021 in Australian politics
2021 in British politics
2021 in international relations
21st-century military alliances
Anglosphere
Foreign relations of China
Foreign relations of France
Military alliances involving Australia
Military alliances involving the United Kingdom
Military alliances involving the United States
Nuclear proliferation
Nuclear technology in Australia
Australia–United Kingdom relations
Australia–United States military relations
United Kingdom–United States military relations
International military organizations
Military technology